The Uganda AIDS Commission (UAC) is a national organization established by parliamentary statute in 1992. The Commission's main objective is to coordinate and monitor the implementation of the national strategy to combat HIV/AIDS, adopted by the Government of Uganda in 1990.

Leadership
The Commission is situated under the Office of the President of Uganda. The current Chairman is Dr Eddie Mukooyo. The Director General of the UAC is Dr Nelson Musoba, a medical doctor and Public Health Expert. Nelson is a former [[Chief of Party (Monitoring and Evaluation of Emergency Plan for AIDS response for Uganda) |supported by PEPFAR] (2013- 2017) and previously was Coordinator of the Global Fund grants Unit at Ministry of Health (May 2008 - May 2013).

See also
 HIV/AIDS
 Millennium goals

References

External links
  Official website

Government agencies of Uganda
HIV/AIDS in Uganda